The 2018–19 Philadelphia 76ers season was the 70th season of the franchise in the National Basketball Association (NBA).

In the 2017–18 season, the 76ers were led by Joel Embiid, who played in his first All-Star Game, and 2018 Rookie of The Year Ben Simmons. During the season, the team made some major trades, In November, they traded Dario Saric, Robert Covington, Jerryd Bayless, and a 2022 second round pick, for Jimmy Butler and Justin Patton. Then just before the trade deadline, they acquired Tobias Harris, Boban Marjanovic and Mike Scott, in exchange for Landry Shamet, Wilson Chandler, Mike Muscala, the Sixers own 2020 first round pick, and the Miami Heat's unprotected first round pick in 2021 and two second round picks in 2021 and 2023. Finally, they traded Markelle Fultz to the Orlando Magic, for Jonathon Simmons, and a first and second round pick. The 76ers would win one less game then the previous season, going 51–31, and clinching the 3rd seed playoff spot for the second consecutive season.

In the playoffs, the 76ers defeated the Brooklyn Nets in the first round in five games, but lost to the eventual NBA champion Toronto Raptors in the Eastern Conference Semifinals in seven games due to a Kawhi Leonard buzzer beater in Game 7, which gave the Raptors a 92–90 victory.

Draft picks

Entering the 2018 NBA Draft, the 76ers had two first round picks and four second round pick. Their top selection was previously acquired through a three-way trade involving the Milwaukee Bucks and Phoenix Suns, with the Suns trading away the Los Angeles Lakers' selection (which was previously protected from 2015–2017 before ending up at #10) in exchange for Brandon Knight, while Philadelphia traded Michael Carter-Williams to Milwaukee, joining Tyler Ennis and Miles Plumlee. Their other first round pick would be their own selection, which rose up as high as #26 thanks to their 17-game winning streak ending the previous season. Philadelphia also acquired two straight selections in the second round at #38 & #39 through trades with the Brooklyn Nets and New York Knicks (for selections that were possibly going to be from the Cleveland Cavaliers and Los Angeles Clippers) respectively. Furthermore, the 76ers held two of the last five picks of the 2018 NBA Draft, with the #56 selection being their own and the last pick of the draft being from the Houston Rockets as a part of Houston's ultimate blockbuster trade to acquire Chris Paul from the Los Angeles Clippers. By the end of the night, their number of selection were cut in half.

Originally, the 76ers selected local small forward Mikal Bridges from Villanova University with the #10 pick of the draft. However, the 76ers would trade Bridges to the Phoenix Suns (thereby returning that selection from their 2012 Steve Nash trade back to them) in exchange for the Miami Heat's unprotected 2021 first round pick and the 16th pick of the draft, which became shooting guard Zhaire Smith from Texas Tech University. Despite starting out the previous season as a less-than-highly regarded prospect, Smith grew his game to be one of the more highly regarded players of the season, as well as a key reason for Texas Tech's journey into the Elite 8. In 37 games played for Texas Tech (21 of which he started in), he averaged 11.3 points (on .556 overall shooting and a .450 three-point percentage), 5 rebounds, 1.8 assists, 1.1 steals, and 1.1 blocks per game, which resulted in him earning spots on both the Big 12 All-Defensive Team and Big 12 All-Newcomer Team. Next, with their original first round pick at #26, Philadelphia selected shooting guard Landry Shamet from Wichita State University. Shamet was a redshirted sophomore who was previously the MVC Freshman of The Year and an All-MVC First Team member in his redshirted freshman year before a conference change lead to him being a member of the All-ACC First Team in his last season at Wichita State. During that season, Shamet averaged 14.9 points (on .489 shooting percentages with a very good .442 three-point percentage), 5.2 assists, 3.2 rebounds, and 0.7 steals in 31.7 minutes per game throughout 32 games played and stated.

As for their second round picks, all of their original selections there would be traded. With the 38th pick (which became point guard Khyri Thomas from Creighton University), Philadelphia traded that selection to the Detroit Pistons in exchange for two future second round picks. A selection later, the 76ers traded the German small forward Isaac Bonga to the Los Angeles Lakers in exchange for the Chicago Bulls' 2019 second round pick and cash considerations. Finally, with their last two second round picks (which became power forward Ray Spalding from Louisville University and Greek combo forward Kostas Antetokounmpo (brother of player Giannis Antetokounmpo) from Dayton University respectively), they would trade both of those second rounders to the Dallas Mavericks in exchange for Dallas' original last second round pick, which was Southern Methodist University point guard Shake Milton at the 54th pick. Throughout his time at Southern Methodist, Milton earned an honor for each season played there, with an All-ACC Rookie Team spot being acquired in his freshman year, and two All-ACC Second Team spots acquired during both his sophomore and junior years respectively. During his last season there, Milton recorded 18 points (on .449 overall shooting percentages with a very good .434 three-point percentage), 4.7 rebounds, 4.4 assists, 1.4 steals, and 0.6 blocks in 36.4 minutes per game throughout 22 games played and started before ending his season prematurely with a hand injury.

Game log

Preseason 

|-style="background:#bfb;"
| 1
| September 28
| Melbourne
| 104–84
| Embiid (20)
| Embiid (13)
| Simmons (16)
| Wells Fargo Center20,318
| 1–0
|-style="background:#bfb;"
| 2
| October 1
| Orlando
| 120–114
| Embiid (21)
| Embiid, Muscala (7)
| Simmons (7)
| Wells Fargo Center12,005
| 2–0
|-style="background:#bfb;"
| 3
| October  5
| Dallas
| 120–114
| Redick (28)
| Embiid (10)
| Simmons (10)
| Mercedes-Benz Arena15,992
| 3–0
|-style="background:#fcc;"
| 4
| October  8
| Dallas
| 112–115
| Embiid (29)
| Simmons (9)
| Simmons, Redick (6)
| Shenzhen Universiade Sports Centre17,396
| 0–0

Regular season 

|- style="background:#fbb"
| 1
| October 16
| @ Boston
| 
| Joel Embiid (23)
| Ben Simmons (15)
| Ben Simmons (8)
| TD Garden18,624
| 0–1
|- style="background:#bfb"
| 2
| October 18
| Chicago
| 
| Joel Embiid (30)
| Ben Simmons (13)
| Ben Simmons (11)
| Wells Fargo Center20,302
| 1–1
|- style="background:#bfb"
| 3
| October 20
| Orlando
| 
| Joel Embiid (32)
| Joel Embiid (10)
| Markelle Fultz (7)
| Wells Fargo Center20,300
| 2–1
|- style="background:#fbb"
| 4
| October 23
| @ Detroit
| 
| Joel Embiid (33)
| Joel Embiid (11)
| T. J. McConnell (8)
| Little Caesars Arena14,418
| 2–2
|- style="background:#fbb"
| 5
| October 24
| @ Milwaukee
| 
| Joel Embiid (30)
| Joel Embiid (19)
| Ben Simmons (11)
| Fiserv Forum17,341
| 2–3
|- style="background:#bfb"
| 6
| October 27
| Charlotte
| 
| Joel Embiid (27)
| Joel Embiid (14)
| Markelle Fultz (4)
| Wells Fargo Center20,203
| 3–3
|- style="background:#bfb"
| 7
| October 29
| Atlanta
| 
| Ben Simmons (21)
| Ben Simmons (12)
| Ben Simmons (9)
| Wells Fargo Center20,269
| 4–3
|- style="background:#fbb"
| 8
| October 30
| @ Toronto
| 
| Joel Embiid (31)
| Joel Embiid (11)
| Ben Simmons (10)
| Scotiabank Arena19,800
| 4–4

|- style="background:#bfb;"
| 9
| November 1
| L.A. Clippers
| 
| Joel Embiid (41)
| Joel Embiid (13)
| Ben Simmons (11)
| Wells Fargo Center20,246
| 5–4
|- style="background:#bfb;"
| 10
| November 3
| Detroit
| 
| Joel Embiid (39)
| Joel Embiid (17)
| Ben Simmons (5)
| Wells Fargo Center20,289
| 6–4
|- style="background:#fbb;"
| 11
| November 4
| @ Brooklyn
| 
| Ben Simmons (20)
| Joel Embiid (15)
| Joel Embiid (4)
| Barclays Center12,826
| 6–5
|-style="background:#bfb;"
| 12
| November 7
| @ Indiana
| 
| Joel Embiid (20)
| Embiid, Simmons (10)
| Ben Simmons (8)
| Bankers Life Fieldhouse16,434
| 7–5
|-style="background:#bfb;
| 13
| November 9
| Charlotte
| 
| Joel Embiid (42)
| Joel Embiid (18)
| Ben Simmons (13)
| Wells Fargo Center20,424
| 8–5
|-style="background:#fbb;"
| 14
| November 10
| @ Memphis
| 
| JJ Redick (20)
| Joel Embiid (16)
| T. J. McConnell (7)
| FedExForum16,904
| 8–6
|-style="background:#bfb;
| 15
| November 12
| @ Miami
| 
| Joel Embiid (35)
| Joel Embiid (18)
| Ben Simmons (7)
| American Airlines Arena19,600
| 9–6
|- style="background:#fbb;"
| 16
| November 14
| @ Orlando
| 
| JJ Redick (22)
| Joel Embiid (13)
| Joel Embiid (10)
| Amway Center15,921
| 9–7
|- style="background:#bfb;"
| 17
| November 16
| Utah
| 
| Jimmy Butler (28)
| Ben Simmons (8)
| Ben Simmons (8)
| Wells Fargo Center20,485
| 10–7
|-style="background:#bfb;"
| 18
| November 17
| @ Charlotte
| 
| Joel Embiid (33)
| Embiid, Simmons (11)
| Ben Simmons (9)
| Spectrum Center19,426
| 11–7
|-style="background:#bfb
| 19
| November 19
| Phoenix
| 
| Joel Embiid (33)
| Joel Embiid (17)
| Ben Simmons (9)
| Wells Fargo Center20,459
| 12–7
|-style="background:#bfb
| 20
| November 21
| New Orleans
| 
| Joel Embiid (31)
| Joel Embiid (19)
| Ben Simmons (7)
| Wells Fargo Center20,352
| 13–7
|- style="background:#fbb
| 21
| November 23
| Cleveland
| 
| Joel Embiid (24)
| Joel Embiid (12)
| Ben Simmons (10)
| Wells Fargo Center19,432
| 13–8
|- style="background:#bfb
| 22
| November 25
| @ Brooklyn
| 
| Jimmy Butler (34)
| Butler, Embiid (12)
| Ben Simmons (9)
| Barclays Center15,217
| 14–8
|- style="background:#bfb
| 23
| November 28
| NY Knicks
| 
| Joel Embiid (26)
| Joel Embiid (14)
| Embiid, Simmons (7)
| Wells Fargo Center20,274
| 15–8
|- style="background:#bfb
| 24
| November 30
| Washington
| 
| Joel Embiid (16)
| Joel Embiid (15)
| Ben Simmons (10)
| Wells Fargo Center20,400
| 16–8

|- style="background:#bfb
| 25
| December 2
| Memphis
| 
| JJ Redick (24)
| Joel Embiid (14)
| Ben Simmons (6)
| Wells Fargo Center20,334
| 17–8
|- style="background:#fbb
| 26
| December 5
| @ Toronto
| 
| Jimmy Butler (38)
| Joel Embiid (12)
| Ben Simmons (11)
| Scotiabank Arena19,800
| 17–9
|- style="background:#bfb
| 27
| December 7
| @ Detroit
| 
| Jimmy Butler (38)
| Joel Embiid (14)
| Jimmy Butler, Simmons (6)
| Little Caesars Arena15,680
| 18–9
|- style="background:#bfb
| 28
| December 10
| Detroit
| 
| Joel Embiid (24)
| Ben Simmons (10)
| Ben Simmons (7)
| Wells Fargo Center20,199
| 19–9
|- style="background:#fbb
| 29
| December 12
| Brooklyn
| 
| Joel Embiid (33)
| Joel Embiid (17)
| Ben Simmons (7)
| Wells Fargo Center20,376
| 19–10
|- style="background:#fbb
| 30
| December 14
| Indiana
| 
| Joel Embiid (40)
| Joel Embiid (21)
| T. J. McConnell (5)
| Wells Fargo Center20,337
| 19–11
|- style="background:#bfb
| 31
| December 16
| @ Cleveland
| 
| Ben Simmons (22)
| Ben Simmons (11)
| Ben Simmons (14)
| Quicken Loans Arena19,432
| 20–11
|- style="background:#fbb
| 32
| December 17
| @ San Antonio
| 
| Redick, Simmons (16)
| Joel Embiid (11)
| Ben Simmons (6)
| AT&T Center17,486
| 20–12
|- style="background:#bfb
| 33
| December 19
| NY Knicks
| 
| Joel Embiid (20)
| Ben Simmons (11)
| Ben Simmons (10)
| Wells Fargo Center20,424
| 21–12
|- style="background:#bfb
| 34
| December 22
| Toronto
| 
| Joel Embiid (27)
| Ben Simmons (12)
| Ben Simmons (8)
| Wells Fargo Center20,691
| 22–12
|- style="background:#fbb
| 35
| December 25
| @ Boston
| 
| Joel Embiid (34)
| Joel Embiid (16)
| Ben Simmons (8)
| TD Garden18,624
| 22–13
|- style="background:#bfb
| 36
| December 27
| @ Utah
| 
| JJ Redick (24)
| Joel Embiid (15)
| Ben Simmons (12)
| Vivint Smart Home Arena18,306
| 23–13
|- style="background:#fbb
| 37
| December 30
| @ Portland
| 
| Ben Simmons (19)
| Jonah Bolden (8)
| Jimmy Butler (6)
| Moda Center19,393
| 23–14

|- style="background:#bfb
| 38
| January 1
| @ L.A. Clippers
| 
| Joel Embiid (28)
| Joel Embiid (19)
| Ben Simmons (8)
| Staples Center17,868
| 24–14
|- style="background:#bfb
| 39
| January 2
| @ Phoenix
| 
| Joel Embiid (28)
| Joel Embiid (19)
| Ben Simmons (6)
| Talking Stick Resort Arena15,226
| 25–14
|- style="background:#bfb
| 40
| January 5
| Dallas
| 
| Joel Embiid (25)
| Ben Simmons (14)
| Ben Simmons (11)
| Wells Fargo Center20,656
| 26–14
|- style="background:#bfb
| 41
| January 8
| Washington
| 
| Landry Shamet (29)
| Joel Embiid (10)
| Ben Simmons (9)
| Wells Fargo Center20,446
| 27–14
|- style="background:#fbb
| 42
| January 9
| @ Washington
| 
| Joel Embiid (35)
| Joel Embiid (14)
| Ben Simmons (8)
| Capital One Arena18,039
| 27–15
|- style="background:#fbb
| 43
| January 11
| Atlanta
| 
| Jimmy Butler (30)
| Ben Simmons (10)
| Ben Simmons (15)
| Wells Fargo Center20,487
| 27–16
|- style="background:#bfb
| 44
| January 13
| @ NY Knicks
| 
| Joel Embiid (26)
| Ben Simmons (22)
| Ben Simmons (9)
| Madison Square Garden18,596
| 28–16
|- style="background:#bfb
| 45
| January 15
| Minnesota
| 
| Joel Embiid (31)
| Joel Embiid (13)
| Ben Simmons (9)
| Wells Fargo Center20,487
| 29–16
|- style="background:#bfb
| 46
| January 17
| @ Indiana
| 
| Jimmy Butler (27)
| Joel Embiid (13)
| Butler, Embiid, Simmons (8)
| Bankers Life Fieldhouse16,007
| 30–16
|- style="background:#fbb
| 47
| January 19
| Oklahoma City
| 
| Joel Embiid (31)
| Ben Simmons (15)
| Ben Simmons (9)
| Wells Fargo Center20,646
| 30–17
|- style="background:#bfb
| 48
| January 21
| Houston
| 
| Joel Embiid (32)
| Embiid, Chandler (14)
| Ben Simmons (6)
| Wells Fargo Center20,313
| 31–17
|- style="background:#bfb
| 49
| January 23
| San Antonio
| 
| Joel Embiid (33)
| Ben Simmons (19)
| Ben Simmons (15)
| Wells Fargo Center20,339
| 32–17
|- style="background:#fbb
| 50
| January 26
| @ Denver
| 
| JJ Redick (22)
| Ben Simmons (12)
| T. J. McConnell (6)
| Pepsi Center19,673
| 32–18
|- style="background:#bfb
| 51
| January 29
| @ L.A. Lakers
| 
| Joel Embiid (28)
| Joel Embiid (11)
| Butler, Embiid, Simmons, McConnell (6)
| Staples Center18,997
| 33–18
|- style="background:#bfb
| 52
| January 31
| @ Golden State
| 
| Embiid, Simmons (26)
| Joel Embiid (20)
| Butler, Simmons (6)
| Oracle Arena19,596
| 34–18

|- style="background:#fbb
| 53
| February 2
| @ Sacramento
| 
| Butler, Embiid (29)
| Joel Embiid (17)
| Jimmy Butler (7)
| Golden 1 Center17,586
| 34–19
|- style="background:#fbb
| 54
| February 5
| Toronto
| 
| Joel Embiid (37)
| Joel Embiid (13)
| Ben Simmons (6)
| Wells Fargo Center20,472
| 34–20
|- style="background:#bfb
| 55
| February 8
| Denver
| 
| JJ Redick (34)
| Joel Embiid (12)
| Ben Simmons (6)
| Wells Fargo Center20,627
| 35–20
|- style="background:#bfb
| 56
| February 10
| L.A. Lakers
| 
| Joel Embiid (37)
| Joel Embiid (14)
| Ben Simmons (7)
| Wells Fargo Center20,683
| 36–20
|- style="background:#fbb
| 57
| February 12
| Boston
| 
| Joel Embiid (23)
| Joel Embiid (14)
| Ben Simmons (5)
| Wells Fargo Center20,582
| 36–21
|- style="background:#bfb
| 58
| February 13
| @ NY Knicks
| 
| Joel Embiid (23)
| Joel Embiid (14)
| Jimmy Butler (8)
| Madison Square Garden18,983
| 37–21
|- style="background:#bfb
| 59
| February 21
| Miami
| 
| Tobias Harris (23)
| Boban Marjanović (12)
| Jimmy Butler (6)
| Wells Fargo Center20,505
| 38–21
|- style="background:#fbb
| 60
| February 23
| Portland
| 
| Ben Simmons (29)
| Tobias Harris (8)
| Ben Simmons (10)
| Wells Fargo Center20,619
| 38–22
|- style="background:#bfb
| 61
| February 25
| @ New Orleans
| 
| Tobias Harris (29)
| Ben Simmons (12)
| Jimmy Butler (7)
| Smoothie King Center17,194
| 39–22
|- style="background:#bfb
| 62
| February 28
| @ Oklahoma City
| 
| Tobias Harris (32)
| Ben Simmons (13)
| Ben Simmons (11)
| Chesapeake Energy Arena18,203
| 40–22

|- style="background:#fbb
| 63
| March 2
| Golden State
| 
| Ben Simmons (25)
| Ben Simmons (15)
| Ben Simmons (11)
| Wells Fargo Center20,624
| 40–23
|- style="background:#bfb
| 64
| March 5
| Orlando
| 
| JJ Redick (26)
| Ben Simmons (13)
| Ben Simmons (8)
| Wells Fargo Center20,379
| 41–23
|- style="background:#fbb
| 65
| March 6
| @ Chicago
| 
| Jimmy Butler (22)
| Ben Simmons (11)
| Ben Simmons (7)
| United Center19,927
| 41–24
|- style="background:#fbb
| 66
| March 8
| @ Houston
| 
| Tobias Harris (22)
| Butler, Harris, Simmons (9)
| Ben Simmons (10)
| Toyota Center18,055
| 41–25
|- style="background:#bfb
| 67
| March 10
| Indiana
| 
| Joel Embiid (33)
| Joel Embiid (12)
| Ben Simmons (6)
| Wells Fargo Center20,636
| 42–25
|- style="background:#bfb
| 68
| March 12
| Cleveland
| 
| Ben Simmons (26)
| Joel Embiid (19)
| Ben Simmons (8)
| Wells Fargo Center20,420
| 43–25
|- style="background:#bfb
| 69
| March 15
| Sacramento
| 
| Jimmy Butler (22)
| Joel Embiid (17)
| Jimmy Butler (7)
| Wells Fargo Center20,704
| 44–25
|- style="background:#bfb
| 70
| March 17
| @ Milwaukee
| 
| Joel Embiid (40)
| Joel Embiid (15)
| Ben Simmons (9)
| Fiserv Forum18,148
| 45–25
|- style="background:#bfb
| 71
| March 19
| @ Charlotte
| 
| Ben Simmons (28)
| Tobias Harris (11)
| Jimmy Butler (9)
| Spectrum Center16,411
| 46–25
|- style="background:#bfb
| 72
| March 20
| Boston
| 
| Joel Embiid (37)
| Joel Embiid (22)
| Ben Simmons (7)
| Wells Fargo Center20,606
| 47–25
|- style="background:#fbb
| 73
| March 23
| @ Atlanta
| 
| Joel Embiid (25)
| Joel Embiid (12)
| Ben Simmons (9)
| State Farm Arena16,640
| 47–26
|- style="background:#fbb
| 74
| March 25
| @ Orlando
| 
| Joel Embiid (20)
| Joel Embiid (10)
| Jimmy Butler (7)
| Amway Center16,848
| 47–27
|- style="background:#bfb
| 75
| March 28
| Brooklyn
| 
| Joel Embiid (39)
| Joel Embiid (13)
| Ben Simmons (8)
| Wells Fargo Center20,547
| 48–27
|- style="background:#bfb
| 76
| March 30
| @ Minnesota
| 
| Tobias Harris (25)
| Jimmy Butler (13)
| Ben Simmons (9)
| Target Center18,978
| 49–27

|- style="background:#fbb
| 77
| April 1
| @ Dallas
| 
| Tobias Harris (25)
| James Ennis III (8)
| Ben Simmons (5)
| American Airlines Center19,645
| 49–28
|- style="background:#fbb
| 78
| April 3
| @ Atlanta
| 
| JJ Redick (30)
| Ben Simmons (15)
| Ben Simmons (8)
| State Farm Arena16,638
| 49–29
|- style="background:#fbb
| 79
| April 4
| Milwaukee
| 
| Joel Embiid (34)
| Joel Embiid (13)
| Embiid, Simmons (13)
| Wells Fargo Center20,701
| 49–30
|- style="background:#bfb
| 80
| April 6
| @ Chicago
| 
| JJ Redick (23)
| Joel Embiid (10)
| Embiid, Harris (5)
| United Center21,059
| 50–30
|- style="background:#fbb
| 81
| April 9
| @ Miami
| 
| Greg Monroe (18)
| Tobias Harris (9)
| Jonathon Simmons (8)
| American Airlines Arena20,153
| 50–31
|- style="background:#bfb
| 82
| April 10
| Chicago
| 
| Jonathon Simmons (20)
| Amir Johnson (9)
| Marjanovic, McConnell (6)
| Wells Fargo Center20,197
| 51–31

Playoffs

|- style="background:#fcc;"
| 1
| April 13
| Brooklyn
| 
| Jimmy Butler (36)
| Joel Embiid (13)
| Tobias Harris (6)
| Wells Fargo Center20,437
| 0–1
|- style="background:#cfc;"
| 2
| April 15
| Brooklyn
| 
| Joel Embiid (23)
| Simmons, Embiid (10)
| Ben Simmons (12)
| Wells Fargo Center20,591
| 1–1
|- style="background:#cfc;"
| 3
| April 18
| @ Brooklyn
| 
| Ben Simmons (31)
| Tobias Harris (16)
| Ben Simmons (9)
| Barclays Center17,732
| 2–1
|- style="background:#cfc;"
| 4
| April 20
| @ Brooklyn
| 
| Joel Embiid (31)
| Joel Embiid (16)
| Ben Simmons (8)
| Barclays Center17,732
| 3–1
|- style="background:#cfc;"
| 5
| April 23
| Brooklyn
| 
| Joel Embiid (23)
| Joel Embiid (13)
| T. J. McConnell (7)
| Wells Fargo Center20,595
| 4–1

|- style="background:#fcc;"
| 1
| April 27
| @ Toronto
| 
| JJ Redick (16)
| Tobias Harris (15)
| Tobias Harris (6)
| Scotiabank Arena19,800
| 0–1
|- style="background:#cfc;"
| 2
| April 29
| @ Toronto
| 
| Jimmy Butler (30)
| Butler, Harris (11)
| Butler, Embiid, Simmons (5)
| Scotiabank Arena19,800
| 1–1
|- style="background:#cfc;"
| 3
| May 2
| Toronto
| 
| Joel Embiid (33)
| Joel Embiid (10)
| Jimmy Butler (9)
| Wells Fargo Center20,658
| 2–1
|- style="background:#fcc;"
| 4
| May 5
| Toronto
| 
| Jimmy Butler (29)
| Jimmy Butler (11)
| Joel Embiid (7)
| Wells Fargo Center20,639
| 2–2
|- style="background:#fcc;"
| 5
| May 7
| @ Toronto
| 
| Jimmy Butler (22)
| Ben Simmons (7)
| Jimmy Butler (7)
| Scotiabank Arena20,287
| 2–3
|- style="background:#cfc;"
| 6
| May 9
| Toronto
| 
| Jimmy Butler (25)
| Joel Embiid (12)
| Jimmy Butler (8)
| Wells Fargo Center20,525
| 3–3
|- style="background:#fcc;"
| 7
| May 12
| @ Toronto
| 
| Joel Embiid (21)
| Joel Embiid (11)
| Ben Simmons (5)
| Scotiabank Arena20,917
| 3–4

Standings

Atlantic division

Conference standings

Roster

<noinclude>

Player statistics

Regular season

|-
| align="left"| || align="center"| PF
| 44 || 10 || 639 || 165 || 40 || 17 || 39 || 207
|-
| align="left"|≠ || align="center"| SF
| 7 || 3 || 140 || 17 || 10 || 12 || 2 || 53
|-
| align="left"|≠ || align="center"| SF
| 55 || 55 || 1,824 || 290 || 220 || 99 || 29 || 1,002
|-
| align="left"|† || align="center"| PF
| 36 || 32 || 951 || 168 || 72 || 22 || 18 || 241
|-
| align="left"|† || align="center"| SF
| 13 || 13 || 440 || 67 || 14 || 24 || 23 || 147
|-
| align="left"| || align="center"| C
| 64 || 64 || 2,154 || style=";"|871 || 234 || 46 || style=";"|122 || style=";"|1,761
|-
| align="left"|≠ || align="center"| SF
| 18 || 2 || 281 || 65 || 14 || 3 || 7 || 95
|-
| align="left"|† || align="center"| SG
| 19 || 15 || 427 || 70 || 59 || 17 || 5 || 155
|-
| align="left"|≠ || align="center"| PF/SF
| 27 || 27 || 944 || 213 || 79 || 11 || 13 || 492
|-
| align="left"|≠ || align="center"| SF
| 5 || 0 || 40 || 5 || 2 || 1 || 0 || 9
|-
| align="left"|‡ || align="center"| PG
| 6 || 0 || 39 || 3 || 5 || 2 || 0 || 22
|-
| align="left"| || align="center"| C
| 51 || 6 || 529 || 147 || 60 || 16 || 13 || 201
|-
| align="left"| || align="center"| SG
| 48 || 7 || 679 || 107 || 52 || 29 || 2 || 279
|-
| align="left"|≠ || align="center"| C
| 22 || 3 || 305 || 113 || 32 || 5 || 10 || 180
|-
| align="left"| || align="center"| PG
| 76 || 3 || 1,470 || 174 || 258 || 79 || 17 || 483
|-
| align="left"| || align="center"| SG/SF
| 20 || 0 || 268 || 35 || 18 || 8 || 8 || 87
|-
| align="left"|≠ || align="center"| C
| 3 || 0 || 52 || 13 || 7 || 1 || 0 || 41
|-
| align="left"|† || align="center"| PF
| 47 || 6 || 1,041 || 200 || 62 || 18 || 27 || 349
|-
| align="left"|‡ || align="center"| C
| 3 || 0 || 21 || 6 || 3 || 2 || 0 || 5
|-
| align="left"| || align="center"| SG
| 76 || 63 || 2,379 || 186 || 206 || 32 || 17 || 1,372
|-
| align="left"|† || align="center"| PF
| 13 || 13 || 396 || 86 || 26 || 4 || 3 || 144
|-
| align="left"|≠ || align="center"| PF
| 27 || 3 || 647 || 102 || 22 || 9 || 5 || 211
|-
| align="left"|† || align="center"| SG
| 54 || 4 || 1,108 || 78 || 59 || 24 || 8 || 449
|-
| align="left"| || align="center"| PG/PF
| style=";"|79 || style=";"|79 || style=";"|2,700 || 697 || style=";"|610 || style=";"|112 || 61 || 1,337
|-
| align="left"|≠ || align="center"| SF
| 15 || 0 || 219 || 26 || 33 || 11 || 1 || 83
|-
| align="left"| || align="center"| SG
| 6 || 2 || 111 || 13 || 10 || 2 || 2 || 40
|}
After all games.
‡Waived during the season
†Traded during the season
≠Acquired during the season

Playoffs

|-
| align="left"| || align="center"| PF
| 10 || 0 || 79 || 14 || 3 || 2 || 1 || 16
|-
| align="left"| || align="center"| SF
| style=";"|12 || style=";"|12 || 421 || 73 || 62 || style=";"|17 || 7 || style=";"|233
|-
| align="left"| || align="center"| C
| 11 || 11 || 334 || style=";"|115 || 37 || 8 || style=";"|25 || 222
|-
| align="left"| || align="center"| SF
| 11 || 0 || 232 || 42 || 12 || 4 || 3 || 83
|-
| align="left"| || align="center"| PF/SF
| style=";"|12 || style=";"|12 || style=";"|443 || 109 || 48 || 13 || 6 || 186
|-
| align="left"| || align="center"| C
| 4 || 0 || 20 || 5 || 2 || 1 || 0 || 8
|-
| align="left"| || align="center"| SG
| 4 || 0 || 36 || 6 || 5 || 0 || 1 || 19
|-
| align="left"| || align="center"| C
| 11 || 0 || 105 || 36 || 11 || 2 || 3 || 64
|-
| align="left"| || align="center"| PG
| 9 || 0 || 75 || 6 || 11 || 2 || 1 || 24
|-
| align="left"| || align="center"| C
| 10 || 1 || 90 || 31 || 4 || 5 || 4 || 40
|-
| align="left"| || align="center"| SG
| style=";"|12 || style=";"|12 || 376 || 17 || 19 || 1 || 3 || 161
|-
| align="left"| || align="center"| PF
| 10 || 0 || 193 || 34 || 5 || 3 || 0 || 56
|-
| align="left"| || align="center"| PG/PF
| style=";"|12 || style=";"|12 || 421 || 85 || style=";"|72 || 15 || 12 || 167
|-
| align="left"| || align="center"| SF
| 7 || 0 || 52 || 9 || 2 || 1 || 0 || 25
|-
| align="left"| || align="center"| SG
| 2 || 0 || 5 || 0 || 0 || 1 || 0 || 0
|}

Transactions

Trades

Free agents

Re-signed

Additions

Subtractions

References

Philadelphia 76ers seasons
Philadelphia 76ers
Philadelphia 76ers
Philadelphia 76ers